Mazda Toyota Manufacturing, U.S.A., Inc. (MTMUS) is a joint venture automobile manufacturing factory in Huntsville, Alabama, United States owned by Japanese automobile manufacturers Mazda and Toyota. 

Ground was broken on a Tennessee Valley Authority-certified megasite in Limestone County on November 16, 2018. When fully operational, the plant is expected to employ 4,000 people building 300,000 vehicles a year.

The plant began operations on September 30, 2021, building the Corolla Cross compact crossover SUV on the "Apollo" assembly line. Production of the Mazda CX-50 compact crossover SUV started on January 26, 2022, on the "Discovery" assembly line.

Products 
 Toyota Corolla Cross (2021–present) - Apollo assembly line
 Mazda CX-50 (2022–present) - Discovery assembly line

See also 

 List of Toyota manufacturing facilities

References 

Huntsville, Alabama
Mazda factories
Toyota factories
Joint ventures
Motor vehicle assembly plants in Alabama